Balitoropsis also known as the lizard loaches is a genus of hillstream loaches native to eastern Asia.

Species
There are currently 2 recognized species in this genus:
 Balitoropsis ophiolepis (Bleeker, 1853) (slender lizard loach)
 Balitoropsis zollingeri (Bleeker, 1853) (black lizard loach)

Species which were once classified in this genus, but are now classified in other genera include:
 In Homalopteroides :
 Homalopteroides stephensoni 
 Homalopteroides yuwonoi 
 In Pseudohomaloptera :
 Pseudohomaloptera batek 
 Pseudohomaloptera leonardi 
 Pseudohomaloptera sexmaculata 
 Pseudohomaloptera tatereganii 
 Pseudohomaloptera vulgaris 
 Pseudohomaloptera yunnanensis

References

Further reading
 

Balitoridae